Paul Earl Green is a former professional American football player who played tight end for four seasons for the Seattle Seahawks and New Orleans Saints.

References

1966 births
Living people
American football tight ends
New Orleans Saints players
Sacramento Surge players
Seattle Seahawks players
USC Trojans football players
People from Coalinga, California
Denver Broncos players